Merry Christmas / Feliz Navidad is a Christmas album by Freddy Fender that was released in 1977.

Track listing 
 "Please Come Home for Christmas"  
 "Pretty Paper"
 "Love Gets Better at Christmas"
 "If Christmas Comes to Your House"
 "Blue Christmas"
 "Christmas in the Valley"
 "Santa! Don't Pass Me By"
 "When They Ring Those Christmas Bells"
 "I'll Be on the Chimney"
 "Natividad (The Infant Song)"

References 

Freddy Fender albums
1977 Christmas albums
ABC Records albums
Christmas albums by American artists
Country Christmas albums